Sergei Ivanovich Chesnakov (born 31 October 1974) is a Russian professional football manager and a former player. He is an assistant coach with FC Luki-Energiya Velikiye Luki.

Club career
He played seven seasons in the Russian Football National League for four different clubs.

External links
 

1974 births
Footballers from Voronezh
Living people
Russian footballers
Association football goalkeepers
Interas-AE Visaginas players
FC Fakel Voronezh players
FC Salyut Belgorod players
Russian football managers
FC Kristall Smolensk players
FC Yenisey Krasnoyarsk players
FC Avangard Kursk players
FC Iskra Smolensk players
Russian expatriate footballers
Expatriate footballers in Lithuania